Massimo Fondelli (born 9 February 1954) is an Italian former water polo player. He competed in the men's tournament at the 1980 Summer Olympics.

See also
 List of world champions in men's water polo
 List of World Aquatics Championships medalists in water polo

References

External links
 

1954 births
Living people
Italian male water polo players
Olympic water polo players of Italy
Water polo players at the 1980 Summer Olympics
Sportspeople from the Province of Genoa
20th-century Italian people
21st-century Italian people